Franco Pepe is an Italian chef who specializes in pizza.

Early life and education 
Pepe's father and grandfather, a wheat farmer, made bread and pizza at the restaurant Osteria Pizzeria Pepe. Pepe was born the year after his father opened his pizzeria, where his mother worked the till.His father encouraged him and his siblings to study and not go into the pizza business, and one of his brothers studied accounting, the other architecture, Pepe physical education.

Career 
Pepe's father died in 1996, and he and his brothers felt a responsibility for continuing their father's business. Pepe eventually wanted to change their father's recipes and methods, and his brothers did not want to, and Pepe left the business to start his own nearby. The relationship was damaged.

Pepe's pizzeria is in Caiazzo in Campania, about an hour from Naples. His first pizzas were pizza fritte, but customers thought fried pizza was too heavy. He worked on lightening the dough and started producing what he called conetto, a tricorner puffy fried dough that he sliced into two smaller horns and garnished with fresh herbs, and these became popular.

Methods 
Pepe focuses on local produce and on dough. He uses a slow-fermentation method but does not refrigerate his dough. Eventually he became known outside of Caiazzo. Jonathan Gold visited and wrote an article in Food & Wine calling Pepe's pizza "probably the best pizza in the world". He uses three different flours to produce a light, chewy crust. 

Pepe makes a pizza Margherita Sbagliata, or "mistaken Margherita", which places mozzarella as the base, and after the pizza is cooked, an uncooked tomato sauce and basil sauce as garnishes. Faith Willinger explains that Italians reject reimagining classic dishes such as pizza Marherita, so when Pepe calls his version "mistaken Margherita", he is saying, "I am making an error here". He makes a fried pizza topped with apricot jam and buffalo mozzarella.

Reception 
Faith Willinger, author of Eating in Italy, calls out Pepe's pizza as her favorite in Italy, saying that he is "the only pizzaiolo in Italiy, if not the world, who does all of his dough by hand". Nancy Silverton commented that for Pepe, pizza was "much more than a vehicle for tomato sauce and melted cheese". Jonathan Gold wrote that his pizza might be the best in the world.

Pepe received two awards as Cavaliere. He was featured on the documentary series Chef's Table. In 2018 his pizza was ranked by Michelin as the best in the world.

Personal life 
His wife is Rita. They have a son and a daughter. The couple separated after he opened his first restaurant. Pepe moved into a small apartment next door to the pizzeria and lived there for six or seven years.

References

Further reading 

 

Italian chefs
Cuisine of Campania
Pizza